Koko Sakibo (born 10 December 1987 in Lagos) is a Nigerian professional football striker who most recently played for 
FC Bardez in the Goa Professional League.

Career
Koko Sakibo started his football career back in Nigeria with local teams before moving to Egypt. There he spent three months with a second division club and returned to Nigeria.

Sakibo's move to India was due to the recommendation of Pune FC defender Chika Wali. Both Sakibo and Wali played together in their home country.  After being unsuccessful with his trials at Pune F.C., Sakibo eventually landed at Vasco S.C. after impressing the Goan club.

Sakibo scored six goals in seven matches in the final round of the second division, as well another 12 in the Goa Professional League.

Dempo S.C. had captured the 2011-12 I-League crown with Koko Sakibo scoring 7 goals.

References 

1987 births
Living people
Nigerian footballers
Expatriate footballers in India
Nigerian expatriate sportspeople in India
I-League players
Vasco SC players
Dempo SC players
Association football forwards